Hema Hemeelu is a 1979 Indian Telugu-language action film directed by Vijaya Nirmala. It stars Akkineni Nageswara Rao, Krishna, Vijaya Nirmala and Zarina Wahab, with music composed by Ramesh Naidu. The fim was produced by S. Raghunath and presented by Krishna under the Sri Vijaya Krishna Movies banner.

Plot
The film revolves around a valuable heritage diamond crown that belongs to a royal dynasty. It's heritor Raja Ranga Prasad leads a happy family life with his wife Rajeswari Devi, two twin boys Raghuveer and Ramachandra and a baby girl Vijaya. Diwanji Sivaramaiah is the true-blue, faithful & devoted person of them lives with his wife Parvati, son Raja and daughter Seeta. Bhujangam, heinous brother-in-law of Ranga Prasad, tries to seize the crown for which he abducts Ranga Prasad and attacks to destroy the royal dynasty. Knowing it, Diwanji rushes to rescue the heirs, in that mishap, everyone gets detached Diwanji, Rajeswari Devi, Raghuveer, Vijaya drop on one side and Parvati, Ramachandra and Seeta to another whereas Raja is raised by a wise person Srinivasa Rao. Years roll by, Raghuveer flames up with avenge against the homicides of his father, in that process, he turns into a daredevil gangster Red Lion with several associates Ganagaram and Lilly. Meanwhile, another dreadful gangster Black Cat, supposed to be Bhujangam's son finds out that the crown is secured in a bank locker and purloins it. During that time, the Bank Agent is slain out by him who is Raja's foster father.

Thereupon, Red Lion winds up Black Cat acquires the crown and conceals it. Being cognizant of his father's death Raja burst out and arrives as one more gangster with an identity Knight King. Here Black Cat falsifies Knight King by posing Red Lion as the culprit when rivalry arises between them. Once in their combat, the Black Cat backstabs Raghuveer and he dies. During that plight, desperate Diwanji fortunately, spots Ramachandra the identical twin of Raghuveer who has just married Seeta. Immediately, Diwanji lifts him, reveals the entire story, trains and replaces him as Raghuveer. Parallelly, Raja and Vijaya get acquainted and fell in love. After some time, Ramachandra learns regarding the activities of Red Lion, also mistakes Knight King as the slaughterer and decides to move in the footsteps of his brother. Eventually, grief-stricken Seeta lands in search of her husband when she is hooked by Black Cat and Raja rescues her. Thereafter, he identifies her as his sister and aims to get back her husband. At present, Raja discovers Raghuveer is only Seeta's husband Ramachandra, as well as, Ramachandra knows regarding the love affair of Raja and Vijaya. There onwards, both of them tangles on each other, but ultimately, the truth comes forward. Finally, the movie ends Red Lion and Knight King eliminating Black Cat and shielding the crown.

Cast

Crew
Art: K. Ramalingeswara Rao
Choreography: N. Srinivas
Fights: Raghavulu
Stills: Bainaa
Story - Dialogues: Tripuraneni Maharadhi
Lyrics: C. Narayana Reddy, Acharya Aatreya, Veturi, Appalacharya 
Playback: S. P. Balasubrahmanyam, P. Susheela, S. P. Sailaja, Anand
Music: Ramesh Naidu
Editing: Adurthi Harinath
Cinematography: Puphtala Gopi Krishna 
Producer: S. Raghunath
Screenplay - Director: Vijaya Nirmala
Presenter: Krishna
Banner: Sri Vijaya Krishna Movies
Release Date: 23 March 1979

Soundtrack

Music composed by Ramesh Naidu. Music released on SEA Records Audio Company.

References

External links
 

Indian action films
Films scored by Ramesh Naidu
1970s Telugu-language films
1979 action films
1979 films
Films directed by Vijaya Nirmala